Jan Fletcher OBE is an entrepreneur who lives in the United Kingdom.  She has successfully built up and run businesses in several sectors, and is currently focused on international property investment and development, natural health products, nutraceuticals and restaurants.

Her portfolio of interests has included haulage, commercial vehicle sales, car dealerships and has built the group to 15 before selling over a period of time. She has also invested in accident repair centres, publishing, radio stations and pharmaceuticals.

In 2013, Fletcher's company Montpellier Estates was ordered to pay £2 million in legal costs after losing a lawsuit against Leeds City Council over contractual dispute for the construction of Leeds Arena.

Awards and recognition 
 1995, Yorkshire Woman of the Year
 1997, Officer of the Order of the British Empire (OBE) for Services to Industry in 1997
 Founding Chairman of Marketing Leeds, in 2004-2008
 2009, awarded an honorary degree by the University of Bradford

References

Year of birth missing (living people)
Living people
Businesspeople from Leeds
Officers of the Order of the British Empire